Pierre Moerlen (23 October 1952, Colmar, Haut-Rhin – 3 May 2005, Sainte-Marie-aux-Mines, near Strasbourg) was a French drummer and percussionist, best known for his work with Gong and Mike Oldfield and as Pierre Moerlen's Gong.

Biography
Pierre Moerlen was born in Colmar (Haut-Rhin) on 23 October 1952, third of five children. His father was an organist and his mother was a music teacher. All five siblings learned music with their parents and all became musicians. Pierre's younger brother, Benoît Moerlen, is also a percussionist (he also worked with Gong and Mike Oldfield).

Pierre left Colmar for Strasbourg to learn percussion with Jean Batigne, founder of Les Percussions de Strasbourg. He was also a member of two rock and rock-jazz bands, including Hasm Congélateur (with included future Magma guitarist Gabriel Federow), whose most notable performance was the opening slot at the Seloncourt Festival in September 1972, headlined by Ange, Genesis and Robert Wyatt's Matching Mole.

In January 1973, Moerlen joined Daevid Allen's Gong, debuting on the Angel's Egg (1973) album. In June 1973 he was asked by Virgin Records's boss Richard Branson to play percussion with Mike Oldfield for the premiere of Tubular Bells (1973), to replace the incapacitated Robert Wyatt. Steve Hillage, guitar player of Gong, also took part. Between 1975-87, beginning with Ommadawn (1975), Moerlen would be Oldfield's percussionist of choice for his albums and his tours.

Moerlen left and returned to Gong several times to tour with Les Percussions de Strasbourg (he created with them Musik im Bauch by Karlheinz Stockhausen and Hiérophonie V by Yoshihisa Taïra at Festival international d'art contemporain de Royan, 1975), and although he recorded You (1974) he left just before the tour promoting that album began.

In the summer of 1975, by which time band founder, Daevid Allen, had left, he was asked to return to co-lead the band with Didier Malherbe and Steve Hillage, who himself left shortly thereafter, only appearing on a couple of tracks on the next album Shamal (1976). Another series of line-up changes resulted in the Gazeuse! (1976) album (released as Expresso in the US) with Allan Holdsworth on guitar, following which Malherbe left, leaving Moerlen as the only link with the "classic" Gong line-up. He retained the name for the next album, Expresso II (1978), but to avoid confusion the band's concerts were often announced as Gong-Expresso. Since this wasn't clear enough, the name Pierre Moerlen's Gong (PMG) was used from 1978 onwards.

At this point the band – which included American musicians Bon Lozaga (guitar) and Hansford Rowe (bass) – were playing jazz fusion rather than the Canterbury scene-influenced psychedelia of old. In 1978, PMG were released from the Virgin contract, and signed with Arista, releasing Downwind (1979), Time is the Key (1979), Pierre Moerlen's Gong Live (1980) and Leave It Open (1980). During this period, Moerlen regularly toured internationally with Mike Oldfield.

PMG ceased operations in 1981 following tours of North America and Europe in late 1980. Later that year, Moerlen briefly joined Magma as second drummer. Following Mike Oldfield's 10th Anniversary tour in 1983, he joined the Swedish progressive/symphonic band Tribute (1985–87).

PMG reformed for two albums and tours in the late 1980s. After spending several years as orchestra pit musician for various musicals, he returned to active service in 1997 when he joined the British jazz-rock outfit Brand X for international touring in 1997. Later that year, he was asked to rejoin Gong, and toured with the band until 1999. He then concentrated on putting together a new PMG line-up and repertoire, which resulted in the studio album Pentanine (2004), recorded in Moscow in 2002.

Death
Pierre Moerlen died unexpectedly in his sleep of natural causes on 3 May 2005, aged 52. At the time of his death he was rehearsing with a new incarnation of Pierre Moerlen's Gong.

Discography

With Gong
 1973: Angel's Egg (Radio Gnome trilogy, part 2)
 1974: You (Radio Gnome trilogy, part 3)
 1976: Shamal
 1977: Gong est Mort, Vive Gong (French live album)
 1977: Gong Live Etc (UK live album)

With Pierre Moerlen's Gong
 1976: Gazeuse! (Expresso in North America) (issued as a "Gong" album)
 1978: Expresso II (issued as a "Gong" album)
 1979: Downwind
 1979: Time is the Key
 1980: Pierre Moerlen's Gong Live
 1981: Leave It Open
 1986: Breakthrough
 1988: Second Wind
 1998: Full Circle Live '88
 2004: Pentanine

With Mike Oldfield
 1975: Ommadawn
 1978: Incantations
 1979: Exposed
 1979: Platinum
 1983: Crises
 1985: The Complete Mike Oldfield
 1987: Islands

In November 1973, Moerlen participated in a live-in-the-studio performance of Mike Oldfield's Tubular Bells for the BBC.[Dead link] It is available on Oldfield's Elements DVD.

With others
 1975: Steve Hillage – Fish Rising
 1975: Slapp Happy – Desperate Straights
 1977: Pekka Pohjola – Mathematician's Air Display
 1979: Mick Taylor – Mick Taylor
 1980: Sally Oldfield – Celebration
 1982: Philip Lynott – The Philip Lynott Album
 1983: Sally Oldfield – Strange Day in Berlin
 1983: Jean-Yves Lievaux – Transformances
 1985: Tribute – Breaking Barriers
 1988: Biréli Lagrène – Inferno
 1995: Project Lo – Dabblings in the Darkness

References

External links
 Pierre Moerlen biography at Calyx, the 'Canterbury Website'
 Pierre Moerlen interview at Calyx
 Pierre Moerlen's Gong discography and album reviews, credits & releases at AllMusic.com
 Pierre Moerlen's chronologic appearances & credits on different albums at Discogs.com

1952 births
2005 deaths
People from Colmar
Jazz fusion drummers
Canterbury scene
French jazz drummers
Male drummers
20th-century French musicians
20th-century drummers
Gong (band) members
20th-century French male musicians
Male jazz musicians
Brand X members